The Nova Scotia order of precedence is a nominal and symbolic hierarchy of important positions within the province of Nova Scotia. It has no legal standing but is used to dictate ceremonial protocol at events of a provincial nature.

Current as of September 2022

 King of Canada (His Majesty Charles III)
 Lieutenant Governor of Nova Scotia (Arthur LeBlanc ONS KC)
 Premier of Nova Scotia (Tim Houston MLA)
 Chief Justice of Nova Scotia (Michael Wood)
 Former Lieutenant Governors
 Myra Freeman CM ONS B.A. B.Ed.
 Mayann Francis ONS DHumL DCL
 John James Grant CM CMM ONS CD
 Former Premiers
 Russell MacLellan KC
 John Hamm OC
 Rodney MacDonald 
 Darrell Dexter KC
 Stephen McNeil MLA
 Iain Rankin MLA
 Speaker of the Nova Scotia House of Assembly (Keith Bain MLA)
 Members of the Executive Council of Nova Scotia
 Allan MacMaster MLA
 Pat Dunn MLA
 John Lohr MLA
 Karla MacFarlane MLA
 Barbara Adams MLA
 Tim Halman MLA
 Kim Masland MLA
 Brad Johns MLA
 Tory Rushton MLA
 Steve Craig MLA
 Colton LeBlanc MLA
 Brian Comer MLA
 Michelle Thompson MLA
 Jill Balser MLA
 Greg Morrow MLA
 Susan Corkum-Greek MLA      
 Becky Druhan MLA    
 Brian Wong MLA 
 Leader of the Opposition (Zach Churchill MLA)
 Members of the King's Privy Council for Canada resident in Nova Scotia
 Elmer MacKay PC KC
 Peter McCreath PC
 David Dingwall PC KC
 Bernie Boudreau PC KC
 Robert Thibault PC
 Geoff Regan PC
 Mark Eyking PC
 Scott Brison PC
 Peter MacKay PC KC
 Bernadette Jordan PC
 Members of the Federal Cabinet who represent Nova Scotia
 Chief Justice of the Supreme Court of Nova Scotia (Deborah K. Smith)
 Associate Chief Justice of the Supreme Court of Nova Scotia (Patrick J. Duncan)
 Associate Chief Justice of the Supreme Court of Nova Scotia (Family Division) (Lawrence O'Neil)
 Justices of the Nova Scotia Court of Appeal
 Justices of the Supreme Court of Nova Scotia
 Chief Judge of the Provincial Court (Pamela S. Williams)
 Associate Chief Judge of the Provincial Court (Vacant)
 Judges of the Provincial Court
 Associate Chief Judge of the Family Court (S. Raymond Morse)
 Judges of the Family Court
 Leader of the Third Party (Claudia Chender MLA)
 Members of the Nova Scotia House of Assembly (with precedence governed by the date of their first election to the Legislature)
 Members of the Senate who represent Nova Scotia (with precedence governed by date of appointment)
 Jane Marie Cordy
 Stephen Greene
 Michael L. MacDonald
 Wanda Thomas Bernard CM ONS
 Daniel Christmas
 Mary Coyle
 Colin Deacon
 Stan Kutcher
 Members of the House of Commons who represent Nova Scotia (with precedence governed by the date of their first election to the House of Commons)
 Andy Fillmore MP
 Darren Fisher MP
 Sean Fraser MP
 Darrell Samson MP
 Mike Kelloway MP
 Jaime Battiste MP
 Kody Blois MP
 Chris d'Entremont MP
 Lena Diab MP
 Stephen Ellis MP
 Rick Perkins MP
 Anglican Bishop of Nova Scotia and Prince Edward Island (Sandra Fyfe)
 Roman Catholic Archbishop of Halifax (Brian Joseph Dunn)
 Leaders of Faith Communities
 Consul General of France in Moncton and Halifax (Johan Schitterer)
 Consul General of the United States of America in Halifax (Lyra S. Carr)
 Mayor of the Halifax Regional Municipality (Mike Savage)
 Commander, Maritime Forces Atlantic and Joint Task Force Atlantic, Canadian Forces (Rear-Admiral Brian Santarpia CD)
 Commander, 5th Canadian Division, Canadian Forces (Brigadier-General Paul Peyton, MSM CD)
 Commanding Officer "H" Division, Royal Canadian Mounted Police (Assistant Commissioner Lee Bergerman)

External links
Nova Scotia Table of Precedence

Nova Scotia
Government of Nova Scotia